is a Shinto shrine located in Osaka, Japan.  It is one of several Toyokuni shrines built in honor of Toyotomi Hideyoshi. It is part of the Osaka Castle Park.

History
Hōkoku Shrine was ordered built in the 12th year of Meiji (1879) by the Emperor.

Images

See also
Toyotomi Hideyoshi
Toyokuni Shrines

External links
Official Site (Japanese)

Chūō-ku, Osaka
Shinto shrines in Osaka
Osaka Castle